Žabovřesky may refer to places in the Czech Republic:

 Žabovřesky (České Budějovice District), village and municipality in the South Bohemian Region
 Žabovřesky nad Ohří, village and municipality in the Ústí nad Labem Region